Marian Keyes (born 10 September 1963) is an Irish author and radio presenter. She is principally known for her popular fiction.

Keyes became known for her novels Watermelon, Lucy Sullivan Is Getting Married, Rachel's Holiday, Last Chance Saloon, Anybody Out There, and This Charming Man, which, although written in a light and humorous style, cover themes including alcoholism, depression, addiction, cancer, bereavement, and domestic violence. More than 35 million copies of her novels have been sold, and her works have been translated into 33 languages. Her writing has won both the Irish Popular Fiction Book and the Popular Non-Fiction Book of the Year, each on one occasion, at the Irish Book Awards.

Biography
Keyes comes from a large family, with many siblings. She was born in Limerick and raised in Cork, Galway, and in Monkstown, Dublin. She graduated from University College Dublin with a law degree, and after completing her studies, she took an administrative job before moving to London in 1986. During this period she became an alcoholic and was affected by clinical depression, culminating in a suicide attempt and subsequent rehabilitation in 1995 at the Rutland Centre in Dublin. In an article for The Daily Telegraph, Keyes details how her struggles with anxiety, depression, and alcoholism began at an early age. Keyes appeared on BBC's Imagine, aired in February 2022, explaining to Alan Yentob how she was distracted from her resolved end-of-life attempt by an episode of "Come Dine With Me"; husband and assistant Tony defused the drama by saying, "let's see how you feel when we've finished watching it," and so began her slow recovery from depression.

Keyes began writing short stories while suffering from alcoholism. After her treatment at the Rutland Centre she returned to her job in London and submitted her short stories to Poolbeg Press. The publisher encouraged her to submit a full-length novel and Keyes began work on her first book, Watermelon. The novel was published the same year. Since 1995 she has published many novels and works of non-fiction.

Keyes has written frankly about her clinical depression, which left her unable to sleep, read, write, or talk. After a long hiatus due to severe depression, a food title, Saved by Cake, was published in February 2012.

Keyes' depressive period lasted about four years. During this time she also wrote The Mystery of Mercy Close, a novel in which the heroine experiences similar battles with depression and suicide attempts as those Keyes herself experienced. As Keyes further describes this period of her life: "It was like being in an altered reality . . . I was always melancholic and prone to sadness and hopelessness but this was catastrophic and unimaginable."

In March 2017, Keyes was a guest castaway for BBC Radio 4's Desert Island Discs. Her favourite track was "You Have Been Loved" by George Michael. She revealed that she had battled constant suicidal urges at the height of her mental illness. During her appearance on the show, Keyes also told host Kirsty Young that in spite of all her efforts to treat her depression, including CBT, medication, mindfulness, hospitalisation and diets, what finally healed her was time: "It was an illness and it ran its course."

In 2019 the National Library of Ireland announced that the Keyes digital archive for her novel The Mystery of Mercy Close would be acquired by the Library as a pilot project for collecting "born digital" archives.

In 2021 and 2022, Keyes joined Tara Flynn in a series for BBC Radio 4 called 'Now You're Asking', in which they discussed problems sent in by listeners (they called them 'askers').

Keyes lives in Dún Laoghaire with her husband Tony Baines (whom she first met on his 30th birthday) after returning to Ireland from London's Hampstead in 1997.

Style
Although many of her novels are known as comedies, they revolve around dark themes, often drawn from Keyes's own experiences, including domestic violence, drug abuse, mental illness, divorce and alcoholism. Keyes considers herself a feminist, and has chosen to reflect feminist issues in many of her books.

Keyes' stories usually revolve around a strong female character who overcomes numerous obstacles to achieve lasting happiness. Regarding her decision to use an optimistic tone and hopeful ending, Keyes has said: "I'm very bleak, really melancholic. But I've always used humour as a survival mechanism. I write for me and I need to feel hopeful about the human condition. So no way I'm going to write a downbeat ending. And it isn't entirely ludicrous to suggest that sometimes things might work out for the best."

Critics recognise Keyes's writing as tackling difficult subjects in a relatable fashion. As told to The Irish Times by another Irish author: "It’s a rare gift....The only other writer I can think of who writes so hilariously and movingly about serious subjects was the late, great Sue Townsend."

Views
During her appearance on Desert Island Discs in March 2017, Keyes told the host that "[by] conditioning women to think that what they find empowering or valuable is worth less than what men consider to be worthwhile, women are prevented from reaching for parity and the gender gap in power and money between men and women is kept in the favour of men".

In an interview with The Irish Times in 2017, Keyes announced that she suspected "gender bias" to be at play when it comes to the recognition of women writers. She said that, despite her perceived success and acclaim, male writers with less commercial success were held in higher regard. "Do you remember in the early noughties when a lot of Irish women writers like Cathy Kelly, Sheila O’Flanagan, Cecelia Ahern were selling all over the world? I don’t feel that was celebrated enough." She went on to "wonder" that "if a group of young Irish men around the same age had been selling in huge numbers", before concluding: "I really think it would not have passed unremarked." Similarly, Keyes has rejected the term "chick lit." During an author Q & A in 2014 with Canada's Chatelaine magazine, when asked how she feels about the term, Keyes claimed that "it’s meant to be belittling. It’s as if it’s saying, 'Oh you silly girls, with your pinkness and shoes, how will you ever run the world?' But as I’ve matured (haha) I’ve realised that I'm very proud of what I write about and I know that the books I write bring happiness and comfort to people". At an event at the Edinburgh Book Festival in August 2020, Keyes rejected the term chick lit as dismissive and sexist, as men writing similar fiction are not described as "dick lit".

Bibliography

Fiction
 Watermelon (1995)    (Claire Walsh)
 Lucy Sullivan Is Getting Married (1996)
 Rachel's Holiday (1998)     (Rachel Walsh)
 Last Chance Saloon (1999)
 Sushi for Beginners (2000)
 No Dress Rehearsal (2000)
 Angels (2002)     (Maggie Walsh)
 The Other Side of the Story (2004)
 Nothing Bad ever Happens in Tiffany's (2005)
 Anybody Out There? (2006)     (Anna Walsh)
 This Charming Man (2008)
 The Brightest Star in the Sky (2009)
 Mammy Walsh's A–Z of the Walsh Family: An e-book Short (August 2012)
 The Mystery of Mercy Close (September 2012)     (Helen Walsh)
 The Woman Who Stole My Life (November 2014)
 The Break (September 2017)
 Grown Ups (February 2020)
 Again, Rachel (February 2022)

Non-fiction
 Under the Duvet (2001) 
 Further under the Duvet (2005)  
 Cracks In My Foundation in Damage Control – Women on the Therapists, Beauticians, and Trainers Who Navigate Their Bodies edited by Emma Forrest (2007) 
 Saved by Cake (2012) 
 Making It Up As I Go Along (February 2016)

Radio
Between Ourselves BBC Radio 4 (2020–2021)
Now You're Asking with Marian Keyes and Tara Flynn BBC Radio 4 (2022–)

Film and television adaptations
Adaptations of Keyes' work include:
Lucy Sullivan Is Getting Married (1999/2000)
Watermelon (16 April 2003)
Au Secours J'ai Trente Ans (2004) – French adaptation of Last Chance Saloon

Awards
2009 – Irish Book Awards; winner of the Irish Popular Fiction Book for This Charming Man
2016 – Irish Book Awards; The Ireland AM Popular Non-Fiction Book of the Year Making It Up As I Go Along
2021 – Irish Book Awards: Author of the Year

References

External links
Official website
Harper Collins website
Marian Keyes' Official Wattpad Profile

1963 births
Living people
Irish romantic fiction writers
Irish women novelists
People from Dún Laoghaire
Writers from County Limerick
Women romantic fiction writers